Mary Agnes Snively (12 November 1847 – 26 September 1933) was a Canadian nurse, later named as the first President of the Canadian Society of Superintendents of Training Schools for Nurses.

Work
Mary Agnes Snively was born in St. Catharines, Ontario, to Martin Snively, born in Ontario, and Susan Copeland, born in Ireland. She was Lady Superintendent of Nurses at the Toronto General Hospital's School of Nursing from 1884 to 1910, where she established the first nursing student residence and a proper curriculum.

She co-founded the International Council of Nurses, and was its Honorary Treasurer from 1900 to 1904. She was also founder and president of the Canadian National Association of Trained Nurses from 1908 to 1912.

References

Sources
Ross-Kerr, J.C. & Wood, M.J. (2003) Canadian Nursing: Issues and Perspectives. Toronto, ON: Mosby.

External links
Famous Canadian Women website 
Nursing website

1847 births
1933 deaths
Canadian educators
Canadian nurses
Canadian people of Irish descent
Nursing educators
People from St. Catharines
Persons of National Historic Significance (Canada)
Canadian women nurses